Alma Ast-Anni (12 December 1884, in Kaavere Parish (now Põltsamaa Parish, Kreis Fellin – 30 October 1958, in Tallinn) was an Estonian politician. She was a member of the Estonian Constituent Assembly, representing the Estonian Social Democratic Workers' Party. She was a member of the assembly since 28 May 1920. She replaced Eduard Vilde.

References

1884 births
1958 deaths
People from Põltsamaa Parish
People from Kreis Fellin
Estonian Social Democratic Workers' Party politicians
Members of the Estonian Constituent Assembly